Andreas Prommegger (born 10 November 1980) is a professional snowboarder.

His speciality is the Parallel competitions in Slalom, in which he is the 2017 and 2023 world champion, and Giant Slalom, in which he won the gold medal at the 2017 World Championships. He also won the silver medal in Parallel Slalom at the 2021 World Championships, losing the final to long-time friend and rival Benjamin Karl.

By winning the 2023 Parallel Slalom title in Bakuriani at 42, he became the oldest world champion ever not only in snowboarding but in all FIS sanctioned events, except grass skiing.

Career highlights

Olympic Winter Games
2006 – Torino, 9th at parallel giant slalom
FIS World Snowboard Championships
1999 – Seiser Alm,  2nd at parallel giant slalom (juniors)
1999 – Berchtesgaden, 43rd at snowboardcross
2000 – Berchtesgaden,  1st at parallel giant slalom (juniors)
2000 – Berchtesgaden,  1st at parallel slalom (juniors)
2001 – Madonna di Campiglio, 22nd at snowboardcross
2001 – Madonna di Campiglio, 10th at parallel giant slalom
2001 – Madonna di Campiglio, 23rd at parallel slalom
2005 – Whistler, 5th at parallel giant slalom
2005 – Whistler, 9th at parallel slalom
2007 – Arosa, 4th at parallel slalom
2007 – Arosa, 5th at parallel giant slalom
World Cup
2004 – Berchtesgaden,  3rd at parallel giant slalom
2004 – Winterberg,  3rd at parallel slalom
2005 – Le Relais,  2nd at parallel giant slalom
2006 – Lake Placid,  3rd at parallel giant slalom
2006 – Furano,  2nd at parallel giant slalom
2007 – Sungwoo,  2nd at parallel giant slalom
2008 – La Molina,  1st at parallel giant slalom
2008 – La Molina,  3rd at parallel slalom
National Championships
2000 – Innichen,  1st at snowboardcross
2001 – Sappada,  3rd at parallel giant slalom
2004 – Bad Gastein,  1st at parallel slalom
2005 – Kreischberg,  1st at parallel giant slalom
2007 – Haus im Ennstal,  1st at giant slalom

References

External links

1980 births
Living people
Austrian male snowboarders
Olympic snowboarders of Austria
Snowboarders at the 2006 Winter Olympics
Snowboarders at the 2010 Winter Olympics
Snowboarders at the 2014 Winter Olympics
Snowboarders at the 2018 Winter Olympics
Snowboarders at the 2022 Winter Olympics